Timandra may refer to:
 Timandra (mythology), half-sister of Helen of Troy
 Timandra (moth), a genus of moth in the family Geometridae
 Croton (plant) (syn. Timandra), a genus of spurge in the family Euphorbiaceae
 603 Timandra, an asteroid
 Timandra (ship), several ships
 Timandra, lover of Aegypius in Greek mythology
 Timandra, mistress of Alcibiades at the time of his assassination